Pop'n Music 9 was first released in 2002 in the arcade, considered a Second Generation Pop'n Music game. It was released on PlayStation 2.

Introduced in this game is "Osusume" Mode. Which allows players to answers a series of questions, then based on the answers they give the player an expert course based on them.

The theme of Pop'n Music 9 is Cafe.

2002 video games
Arcade video games
Japan-exclusive video games
Konami arcade games
Konami games
PlayStation 2 games
Video games developed in Japan